Gihofi is a city in eastern Burundi. It is located close to the border with Tanzania, to the south of Mount Kikizi and southeast of Rutana.

References
Fitzpatrick, M., Parkinson, T., & Ray, N. (2006) East Africa. Footscray, VIC: Lonely Planet.

Populated places in Burundi